Fastweb may refer to:
 Fastweb, a free online scholarship search service
 Fastweb (telecommunications company), an Italian broadband telecommunications company
 Fast Web Media, a UK-based Digital Marketing agency
 FASTWeb, an online business documents and services portal, from the First American Corporation.